An eternity ring, also known as an infinity ring, is a woman's ring comprising a band of precious metal (usually gold) set with a continuous line of identically cut gemstones (usually diamonds) to symbolize never-ending love, usually given by a spouse to their wife on the occasion of a significant anniversary, typically after 5 years of marriage. Because the presence of stones all the way round the eternity ring can make it cumbersome to wear, the alternative is to have the stones across the face of the ring only.  This is sometimes referred to as a "half-eternity" ring rather than a "full" eternity ring.

Eternity rings featuring paste gems, white topaz or a mix of stones appeared in the 18th century.

History
The concept of a diamond eternity ring was created in the 1960s by diamond merchant De Beers. American investigative journalist Edward Jay Epstein stated that at the time the company had a secret agreement with the Soviet Union which, in return for the creation of a "single channel" controlling the world's supply of diamonds, 'required' the purchase of 90–95% of the uncut gem diamonds produced by Russia. The prevailing fashion at the time, particularly for engagement rings, was for them to be set with a single, large diamond. The Soviet gems were, however, small, often less than 0.25 carats.  To avoid stockpiling, De Beers embarked on a campaign of promotion of jewelry containing a number of small diamonds, culminating in the eternity ring, which was aimed at older, married women.  One campaign slogan aimed at husbands was, "She married you for richer or poorer. Let her know how it’s going."

References

Rings (jewellery)
Marriage